Basant Bahar may refer to:

Basant Bahar (raga), a raga in Hindustani classical music
Basant Bahar (film), a 1956 Indian film